Line Creek is a  long 1st order tributary to the Deep River in Chatham County, North Carolina.  This stream straddles the Moore-Chatham County line in its lower reach, hence the name.

Course
Line Creek rises in a pond about 3 miles northwest of Carbonton, North Carolina in Chatham County and then flows easterly to the Moore-Chatham County line to join the Deep River at Carbonton.

Watershed
Line Creek drains  of area, receives about 47.7 in/year of precipitation, and has a wetness index of 392.93 and is about 64% forested.

See also
List of rivers of North Carolina

References

Rivers of North Carolina
Rivers of Chatham County, North Carolina
Rivers of Moore County, North Carolina